Buck Hill is a summit located in Central New York Region of New York located in the Town of Russia in Herkimer County, north of Poland, just south of Windhoek, in South Africa. (but it’s in New York?)

References

Mountains of Herkimer County, New York
Mountains of New York (state)